Kim Hyo-jin (Hangul: 김효진; born September 18, 1981) better known by her stage name JeA is a South Korean singer and songwriter. She is best known as the leader of South Korean girl group Brown Eyed Girls. As a solo artist, she has contributed numerous songs to various soundtracks.

Career

Brown Eyed Girls

JeA is the one responsible for the creation of Brown Eyed Girls and was actively involved in the selection of the other members besides herself.  The four members – JeA, Narsha, Ga In and Miryo – performed several small shows under the name "Crescendo" before officially debuting as Brown Eyed Girls in 2006. JeA is the leader and main vocalist of the group.

Solo career
JeA released her first solo album, "Just JeA", in 2013. She is the last of the members of Brown Eyed Girls to release a solo album.
Aside from being a singer she's also a composer and producer. She started composing for her group with their second album and later on wrote songs for other artists also. She expanded her resume by trying her hand on producing with the Brown Eyed Girls' The Original and her solo album.

On August 4, 2021, Mystic Story's contract with JeA expired. In November 2022, Jea signed with Green Snake E&M.

Song writing
JeA is an avid songwriter, and has written many songs for herself, Brown Eyed Girls and other artists.

List of songs written by JeA

Discography

Extended plays

Singles

Soundtrack appearances

Other charted songs

Filmography

Television shows

References

External links

 

Living people
South Korean women pop singers
South Korean female idols
South Korean rhythm and blues singers
Brown Eyed Girls members
1981 births